Chukkan is a 1994 Indian Malayalam-language film, directed and produced by Thampi Kannanthanam. The film stars Suresh Gopi, Gautami, Thilakan and Kaviyoor Ponnamma.

Synopsis
Gaurishankar is an unemployed youth, who gets spirited by environmental issues a factory causes. However, those who supported him for the cause had ulterior motives. His father Shnkaran  Nair is the sole breadwinner of the family and he works with the factory, and Gauri's actions costs him dearly. Gauri after understanding that he was fooled by greedy politicians and their masters, a capitalist known as Mr.X plays their dirty game as a team player only to betray them later.

Cast
Suresh Gopi as Gaurishankar 
Gautami as Gayathri, Gaurishankar's love interest
Thilakan as Shankaran Nair
Jagathy Sreekumar as Sreeraman 
M. G. Soman as Parol Padmanabhan
Narendra Prasad as Mahendran
Rajan P. Dev as Iyer
N. F. Varghese as Chandran
Jose Prakash as Narayanan
Vijayaraghavan as Sreenivasan
 Kaviyoor Ponnamma as Gourishankar's Mother
Bobby Kottarakkara 
Baiju as Vikky/Vigneshwaran
Kundara Johny as Ganapathy
Kuthiravattam Pappu as Beeranikka 
Riza Bava as Viswan
Shanthakumary
Renuka as Leela
Sabitha as Sindhu
Jose Pellissery as Manjooran
Pala Aravindan as Krishnanunni
Seena Antony as Ammu

Soundtrack
The music was composed by S. P. Venkatesh.

References

External links
  
 

1994 films
1990s Malayalam-language films
Films directed by Thampi Kannanthanam